Bayou St. John is a neighborhood of the city of New Orleans.  A subdistrict of the Mid-City area, its boundaries as defined by the New Orleans City Planning Commission are: Esplanade Avenue to the north, North Broad Street to the east, St. Louis Street to the south, and Bayou St. John (the waterway) to the west.

Geography
According to the United States Census Bureau, the district has a total area of ,.

Adjacent neighborhoods
 Faubourg St. John
 Fairgrounds (north)
 Tremé (east)
 Mid-City (west)
 City Park (west)

Boundaries
The New Orleans City Planning Commission defines the boundaries of Bayou St. John as these streets: Esplanade Avenue, North Broad Street, St. Louis Street and Bayou St. John.

Demographics
As of the census of 2000, there were 4,861 people, 2,113 households, and 1,082 families living in the neighborhood.  The population density was 11,574 /mi² (4,419 /km).

As of the census of 2010, there were 3,529 people, 1,719 households, and 747 families living in the neighborhood.

See also
 Faubourg St. John
 Neighborhoods in New Orleans

References

Neighborhoods in New Orleans